Rubiyan salad ( or jambariyy salad  meaning shrimp salad), is a salad of Arab salads, it typically of shrimp, tomato. mayonnaise, lettuce leaves, ketchup, hot sauce, mustard, lemon juice, and salt.

See also
 List of Arab salads

References

Arab cuisine
Salads